Tapri Junction railway station is a railway station in Saharanpur district, Uttar Pradesh. Its code is TPZ. It serves Tapri town. The station consists of two platforms. Passenger, Express, and Superfast trains halt here.

Trains

The following trains halt at Tapri Junction railway station in both directions:

 Farrukhnagar–Saharanpur Janta Express
 Dehradun Jan Shatabdi Express
 Udaipur City–Haridwar Express
 Kalinga Utkal Express
 Yoga Express
 Uttaranchal Express
 Lokmanya Tilak Terminus–Haridwar AC Superfast Express
 Bandra Terminus–Haridwar Express

Gallery

References

Railway stations in Saharanpur district
Delhi railway division